John Stanley Hawkins  (30 June 1903 – 23 August 1965) was an  Anglican priest: the Archdeacon of Totnes from 1962 until his death.

He was educated at St Chad's College and ordained in 1933. He began his career as a Curate at St Stephen's, Liverpool, after which he was Rector of Dalwallinu then South Perth, Western Australia. During World War II he was a chaplain in the RAAF. Returning to England he was a Curate at Wolborough then Vicar of Withycombe Raleigh.

His son Richard became Bishop of Crediton.

References

1903 births
Alumni of St Chad's College, Durham
Archdeacons of Totnes
1965 deaths